Robert Szczepaniak (born 4 April 1942 in Cransac) is a French retired professional football midfielder.

International career
Sczczepaniak was born in France, and is of Polish descent. He represented the France national football team.

References

External links
Profile on French federation official site
Profile - Racing Strasbourg
Profile - FC Metz

1942 births
Living people
French footballers
France international footballers
French people of Polish descent
Association football midfielders
AS Saint-Étienne players
RC Strasbourg Alsace players
FC Metz players
Racing Besançon players
Ligue 1 players
Ligue 2 players
French football managers
Thionville FC managers